Hamburg '72 is an album by Keith Jarrett with his first trio, Charlie Haden on double-bass, and Paul Motian on drums. It was recorded live in West Germany on June 14, 1972 and released on the ECM label in 2014  when both Motian and Haden had already died.

1972 mini-European Tour
Hamburg '72 was recorded in concert during a European mini-tour in which, according to www.keithjarrett.org, Jarrett's first trio offered recitals in Hungary, France and Germany :
 3 June - Székesfehérvár, (Hungary) - Alba Regia Jazz Festival 
 9 June - Studio 104, Maison de la Radio, Paris, (France) 
 12 June - Munich (Germany) 
 14 June - Funkhaus, NDR Jazz Workshop, Hamburg, (Germany) 
 16 June - Skulpturengarten, Neue Nationalgalerie, Berlin, (Germany)

Reception 

The album received several positive reviews on release. The Allmusic review by Thom Jurek awarded the album 4 stars, stating, "Hamburg '72 is not only an excellent archival recording that documents one of jazz's most capable, sophisticated trios, it is expansive, inspiring modern jazz at its best, and it continues to resonate and inspire".

The Observers Dave Gelly called it "an invaluable memento of an unrepeatable group". On All About Jazz, John Kelman observed: "Hamburg '72 is a true milestone from the first of its 56 minutes to the last—a classic once lost, but now found again and sounding better than ever".

JazzTimes Thomas Conrad said: "By 1972, [Jarrett's] taut, dramatic timing, his personal harmonic concept and especially his touch were in place. He could already make piano notes hang forever in the air. He is equally capable of rocking the Funkhaus to its foundations".

Track listing 
All compositions by Keith Jarrett, except as indicated

Personnel 
 Keith Jarrett – piano, soprano saxophone, flute, percussion
 Charlie Haden - double bass
 Paul Motian - drums

Production
 Manfred Eicher - producer, remixing
 Michael Naura - radio producer
 Hans-Heinrich Breitkreuz - engineer (recording)
 Jan Erik Kongshaug - engineer (remixing: July 2014)
 Sascha Kleis - design
 Johanness Anders - photography

References 

Keith Jarrett live albums
2014 live albums
ECM Records live albums
Albums produced by Manfred Eicher